Fernando Vega Torres (born 3 July 1984) is a Spanish former professional footballer who played as a left-back.

He totalled 79 matches in La Liga over three seasons, with Betis.

Club career
Born in Arahal, Province of Seville, Vega started his career with Sevilla FC, playing two full seasons for its B team in the Segunda División B. In 2005–06 he represented modest Lorca Deportiva CF in the Segunda División, with the side eventually finishing fifth but being relegated the campaign after his departure.

Vega joined Real Betis in July 2006 on a free transfer, and eventually became first choice at the Andalusia club in his first season after ousting veteran Enrique Romero. He appeared in 31 La Liga matches apiece the following two years, and his team would be relegated in the second; he made his debut in the Spanish top flight on 26 August 2006, coming on as a late substitute in a 2–1 away loss against Valencia CF.

On 31 August 2011, after participating in only six league games (out of 42) as the Verdiblancos returned to the top division after a two-year absence, Vega was released even though he had a contract running until June 2014. In early January 2012, following an unsuccessful trial with England's Portsmouth, he signed for neighbouring Recreativo de Huelva of the second tier.

On 31 August 2015, after suffering relegation with Recre, Vega moved to CD Lugo also in division two.

International career
Vega earned his only cap for Spain at under-21 level on 17 February 2004, as a late substitute in the 2–1 friendly win over Norway.

References

External links

1984 births
Living people
People from Campiña de Morón y Marchena
Sportspeople from the Province of Seville
Spanish footballers
Footballers from Andalusia
Association football defenders
La Liga players
Segunda División players
Segunda División B players
Sevilla Atlético players
Lorca Deportiva CF footballers
Real Betis players
Recreativo de Huelva players
CD Lugo players
Spain youth international footballers
Spain under-21 international footballers